Moshe "Bogie" Ya'alon (born Moshe Smilansky on 24 June 1950) is an Israeli politician and former Chief of Staff of the Israel Defense Forces, who also served as Israel's Defense Minister under Benjamin Netanyahu from 2013 until his resignation on 20 May 2016. Ya'alon ran for Knesset in 2019 as the number three member of the Blue and White party, a joint list created by the merging of the Israel Resilience Party, led by former IDF chief of staff Benny Gantz, and Yesh Atid, led by Yair Lapid. Ya'alon briefly served as the number 2 on the Yesh Atid-Telem list that was created following the 2020 Israeli legislative election. Ya'alon retired from politics in the lead up to the 2021 election after testing the waters by splitting his Telem party from Yesh Atid.

Early life 
Ya'alon was born Moshe Smilansky, the son of David Smilansky and Batya Silber. His father, a factory worker, had moved to Mandatory Palestine with his parents from Ukraine in 1925, and was a veteran of the Haganah and Jewish Brigade. His mother was a Holocaust survivor from Galicia who had fought against the Nazis with partisans during World War II. She came to Palestine in 1946. Ya'alon grew up in Kiryat Haim, a working-class suburb of Haifa. He was active in the Labor Zionist youth movement "HaNoar HaOved VeHaLomed" and joined a Nahal group named Ya'alon, a name he later adopted. He later moved to kibbutz Grofit, in the Arava region near Eilat, where he worked in the cowshed and as a tractor operator.

Military career

In 1968, Ya'lon was conscripted into the Israel Defense Forces, and volunteered as a paratrooper in the Paratroopers Brigade. He served as a soldier and a squad leader in the Brigade's 50 battalion and fought in the War of Attrition. He was discharged in 1971.

In 1973, he was called up as a reservist during the Yom Kippur War. On 15 October 1973, his unit, the 55th Paratroopers Brigade, became the first IDF unit to cross the Suez Canal into mainland Egypt. He continued fighting as part of the Israeli drive into the Egyptian mainland; he participated in the encirclement of the Egyptian Third Army. Following the war, he rejoined the IDF as a career soldier, and became an infantry officer after completing Officer Candidate School. He then returned to the Paratroopers Brigade as a platoon leader. Later on he served as a company commander in the Brigade's 50 battalion and led the Brigade's Reconnaissance company in several special operations and during Operation Litani.

During the 1982 Lebanon War, Ya'alon joined the Sayeret Matkal commando unit as a commander. He then rejoined the Paratroopers Brigade and was appointed as the commander of its 890 "Efe" (Echis) paratroop battalion. During this time, he was wounded in the leg while leading a pursuit of Hezbollah fighters in Lebanon.

Ya'alon took a sabbatical to the United Kingdom to study at the British Army's Camberley Staff College. Upon his return to Israel, he was promoted to the rank of Colonel and appointed commander of Sayeret Matkal. Ya'alon led it to many notable achievements, for which the unit received four recommendations of honor. After his tenure as commander was finished, Ya'alon studied at the University of Haifa, obtaining a BA in Political Science, and took an Armored Corps course. In 1990, Ya'alon was appointed commander of the Paratroopers Brigade, and two years later, became commander of the Judea and Samaria Division. On 10 December 1992, Ya'alon killed a militant from the Islamic Jihad Movement in Palestine with a hand grenade after the militant had shot dead a Yamam operative attempting to arrest him. In 1993, he was appointed commander of an IDF training base, and commander of an armored division. In 1995, Ya'alon was promoted to Major General and appointed head of Military Intelligence. In 1998, he was appointed commanding officer of Israel's Central Command. He was serving in this position when the Second Intifada was launched in September 2000.

Ya'alon was appointed Chief of Staff of the Israel Defense Forces (IDF) on 9 July 2002, and served in that position until 1 June 2005. The major focus throughout his tenure as chief of staff was the army's effort to quell the Second Intifada. Under his watch, the IDF conducted Operation Defensive Shield.

In February 2005, Defense Minister Shaul Mofaz decided not to extend Ya'alon's service as chief of staff for another year. This marked the climax of tensions between Mofaz and Ya'alon, which had arisen partly through Ya'alon's objection to the Gaza disengagement plan. On 1 June 2005, Ya'alon retired from the army, and Dan Halutz, his successor as chief of staff, oversaw the disengagement.

In December 2005, relatives of the victims of the 1996 shelling of Qana filed a suit against Ya'alon in Washington, D.C., for his alleged role in their deaths. In late 2006, while Ya'alon was in New Zealand on a private fund-raising trip for the Jewish National Fund, Auckland District Court judge Avinash Deobhakta issued a warrant for his arrest for alleged war crimes arising from his role in the 2002 assassination of Hamas commander Salah Shehade, who was killed in a targeted assassination, when an Israeli warplane bombed his home in Gaza City. About 14 Palestinian civilians were also killed in the airstrike. Deobhakta stated that New Zealand had an obligation to prosecute him under the Geneva Convention. Attorney-General Michael Cullen ordered a stay in the warrant after advice from the Crown Law office that there was insufficient evidence to prosecute, and the warrant was cancelled after Ya'alon left New Zealand.

He was appointed Minister of Defense on 17 March 2013. He resigned on 20 May 2016, citing "difficult disagreements on moral and professional matters" with prime minister Netanyahu and warning that "extreme and dangerous elements have taken over Israel and the Likud Party".

Think tanks and institutes
After leaving his position as chief of staff, Ya'alon spent time in the think tank Washington Institute for Near East Policy and became a Senior Fellow at the Adelson Institute for Strategic Studies at the Shalem Center Institute for International and Middle East Studies. Ya'alon also served as the chairman of the Center for Jewish Identity and Culture at Beit Morasha in Jerusalem.

Political career

Ya'alon backed the Oslo Accords, but later he "admitted his mistake." On 17 November 2008, Ya'alon announced that he was joining Likud and that he would participate in the primaries which would determine the Likud candidates for the 2009 elections. He won eighth place on the party's list, and entered the Knesset as Likud won 27 seats. Upon the formation of the Netanyahu government, he was appointed Vice Prime Minister (alongside Silvan Shalom) and Minister of Strategic Affairs. In March 2013, he replaced Ehud Barak as Defense Minister.

As Defense Minister Ya'alon decided to continue to manufacture and purchase Merkava tanks for the IDF, after the whole project was in question due to budget issues and the overall discussion of the necessity of tanks in modern battlefields. During Ya'alon's tenure, foreign sources claimed that the Israeli Air Force launched several airstrikes on advanced weapons deposits in Syria before they were transferred to Hezbollah.

In January 2015, the leader of Lehava anti-assimilation group, Ben-Zion Gopstein, voiced harsh criticism against Ya'alon after Channel 2 reported that he was expected to categorize Lehava as a terrorist organization. Ya'alon ordered the Shin Bet and the Defense Ministry to assemble evidence required for the classification. Lehava promotes the ideology of the late Jewish Defense League leader Meir Kahane. Three members of Lehava were arrested and indicted in 2014 for committing arson and spray-painting anti-Arab graffiti at the Max Rayne Hand in Hand (Yad B'Yad) Bilingual School in Jerusalem and Lehava's leader Ben Zion Gopstein along with other group members were arrested shortly thereafter for incitement. The arson incident received international attention. Gopstein said "I suggest that [Ya'alon] aim to outlaw the Islamist Movement and then preoccupy itself with an anti-assimilation group... Instead of taking care of an enemy of Israel, the defense minister is trying to win over votes from the Left [by] taking on Lehava. The group acts to save the daughters of Israel [Jewish women] and deserves the Israel Prize."

In February 2015 Ya'alon took a political stand on gay marriage. In a speech he promised to help promote LGBT rights in Israel, and in particular noted he would support the establishment of civil marriage laws in Israel that would allow same-sex couples to be recognized as a family unit.

Following the 2016 shooting by an Israeli soldier of a wounded Palestinian assailant, Ya'alon said that the soldier's action "completely contradicts IDF values and its battle ethics; even in a moment of great anger we must not permit such unbridled and uncontrolled behavior." This statement was viewed by many Israelis as prejudging the case.

Ya'alon formed Telem on 2 January 2019.

On January 29, 2019, Ya'alon announced a political alliance with former IDF chief of staff Benny Gantz. Ya'alon was in the number two position on Gantz's Israel Resilience Party list. Ya'alon reiterated his opposition to a "two states for two peoples" solution to the Israeli-Palestinian conflict. On 21 February 2019, the Israel Resilience Party and Telem merged with Yesh Atid. Ya'alon became the number three candidate on the united list, known as the "Blue and White" party. Following the party's split after the 2020 Israeli legislative election, Ya'alon's party aligned with Yair Lapid to form the Yesh Atid-Telem alliance and became second in the list.

In the run up to the 2021 Israeli legislative election, Ya'alon's party split from Yesh Atid. After multiple polls showing the party unable to pass the 3.5 percent election threshold, Ya'alon decided to quit the race.

Controversial statements

Palestinian threat as 'cancer'
On 27 August 2002, he told the Haaretz newspaper: "The Palestinian threat harbors cancer-like attributes that have to be severed. There are all kinds of solutions to cancer. Some say it's necessary to amputate organs but at the moment I am applying chemotherapy." In January 2004, he publicly stated that the thirteen Sayeret Matkal soldiers who refused to serve in the Israeli-occupied territories were taking the unit's name in vain.

On the need to confront Iran
In January 2008, during a discussion at IDC Herzliya, Ya'alon said "There is no way to stabilize the situation all over the world and especially in the Middle East without confronting Iran." According to The Sydney Morning Herald Ya'alon said: "We have to confront the Iranian revolution immediately. There is no way to stabilize the Middle East today without defeating the Iranian [government]. The Iranian nuclear program must be stopped."

When asked whether "all options" included a military deposition of Ahmadinejad and the rest of Iran's current leadership, Ya'alon told The Herald: "We have to consider killing him. All options must be considered."

The Peace Now/'virus' incident
In August 2009, Ya'alon visited the ruins of Homesh, a settlement that was destroyed in Israeli disengagement from Gaza in 2005 and toured Israeli settlements in the north of the West Bank, considered as un-authorized outposts. He said that these communities are all legitimate and should not be called "illegal." In addition, he participated in a convention of Manhigut Yehudit ("Jewish Leadership"), the more right-wing Settlers' segment within the Likud right-wing Party, in which he condemned the disengagement plan, called Peace Now a "virus" and said that "We become accustomed to Arabs being permitted to live everywhere, in the Negev, Galilee, Nablus, Jenin, and [on the other hand] there are areas where Jews are not allowed to live. We caused this." He also stated that, "regarding the issue of the settlements, in my opinion Jews can and should live everywhere in the Land of Israel. Now, ... first of all, every settlement needs to get the approval of the authorities, and what goes up on the spot, in contradiction to these decisions and so on is not legitimate. It's against the law".

Later, after meeting with PM Netanyahu, Ya'alon retracted parts of his statements and said that he "recognized the importance of democratic discourse and respecting other opinions." Ya'alon explained that, indeed, all Israelis want peace, now. He stressed, however, the need to accept the fact that peace will not come immediately, otherwise it "hurts Israel." Ya'alon stated that, in his view, the way of thinking that Israel just needs to give one more piece of land and then it will have peace is a kind of "virus."

U.S. Secretary of State John Kerry and U.S. engagement in the peace process
In January 2014, Ya'alon was quoted in an Israeli newspaper calling U.S. Secretary of State John Kerry "obsessive" and "messianic," and claiming that the "only thing that can save us is if Kerry wins the Nobel Prize and leaves us alone." The remarks attributed to him precipitated a diplomatic row with the U.S. State Department and elicited criticism of members of Israel's government. In October 2014 during a visit to the U.S. Ya'alon met with his counterpart, Defense Secretary Chuck Hagel, but was denied requests to meet with Vice President Joe Biden and Secretary of State John Kerry. A U.S. official told the Jerusalem Post that the snub should come as no surprise.

Segregation of buses
In October 2014, Ya'alon supported a plan that would effectively ban Palestinian workers from buses used by Jewish settlers. Ya'alon said that his plan was based on security needs. The IDF said that there was no security issue with integrated buses given that all West Bank Palestinian workers go through security checkpoints. When Ya'alon's move was criticized as being a form of apartheid, Yehuda Weinstein, Israel's Attorney General, demanded that Ya'alon explain his rationale.

Resuming settlement construction once Obama is gone
In late 2014 at a meeting with Jewish settlers on the West Bank who questioned Israel's apparent delay in settler construction, Ya'alon said that settlement construction represented the greatest growth in Israel and with regard to any apparent slowdown, he declared, "It's temporary. There is a certain administration now in the United States, which is leading this policy. This administration will not stay forever and I hope it's temporary." He commented that it is important for Israel not to antagonize the U.S. at the moment, because  American support is needed in countering diplomatic undertakings at the U.N. that he claimed were "anti-Israel." "The publication of construction plans, even in Jerusalem, draws a response from various bodies, including our friends, that attack us," he said. But he noted that he very much wanted to approve construction plans. Ya'alon's remarks about not antagonizing the U.S. came at a time when an opinion poll showed that the "overwhelming majority" of Israelis believe their country's relationship with the U.S. has been hurt as a result of the poor relationship between Obama and Netanyahu. In response to the Ya'alon's remarks, which were broadcast of Israeli Army Radio, a spokesperson for Ya'alon claimed, "this does not diminish in any way the appreciation and esteem Minister Ya'alon has for the contribution of the U.S. and its government to the security of Israel and the fact that the U.S. is Israel's best friend and strategic anchor." Responding to the latest of Ya'alon negative comments about the Obama administration, U.S. State Department spokeswoman Jen Psaki said, "This administration's opposition to settlements is fully consistent with the policies of administrations for decades, including of both parties. So the notion that that would change is not borne out by history."

Personal life
Ya'alon is married with three children. He and his wife live in Modi'in-Maccabim-Re'ut, and are still members of Kibbutz Grofit.

See also
Media coverage of the Arab–Israeli conflict

References

Bibliography
"The IDF and the Israeli Spirit", by Moshe Ya'alon, Azure magazine, Spring 2006, no. 24
"Israel and the Palestinians: A New Strategy" by Moshe Ya'alon, Azure magazine, Autumn 2008, no. 34
"A New Strategy for the Israeli-Palestinian Conflict" , by Moshe Ya'alon, Jerusalem Center for Public Affairs, Vol. 8, No. 10, 2 September 2008

External links

Moshe Ya'alon, Israeli Ministry of Foreign Affairs
"Taking stock", Moshe Ya'alon profile and interview by Yaakov Katz, Jerusalem Post, published 30 April 2009 & updated 7 May 2009 (Accessed 26 October 2011)

1950 births
Living people
Directors of the Military Intelligence Directorate (Israel)
Foreign recipients of the Legion of Merit
Government ministers of Israel
Graduates of the Staff College, Camberley
Israeli expatriates in the United Kingdom
Israeli Jews
Israeli people of Ukrainian-Jewish descent
Israeli people of the Yom Kippur War
Jewish military personnel
Likud politicians
Telem (2019 political party) politicians
Blue and White (political alliance) politicians
Members of the 18th Knesset (2009–2013)
Members of the 19th Knesset (2013–2015)
Members of the 20th Knesset (2015–2019)
Members of the 21st Knesset (2019)
Members of the 22nd Knesset (2019–2020)
Ministers of Defense of Israel
People from Haifa
Recipients of the Legion of Merit
University of Haifa alumni
Leaders of political parties in Israel
Members of the 23rd Knesset (2020–2021)